Al-Humayra (Arabic: الحميرة) is a Syrian village in the An-Nabek District of the Rif Dimashq Governorate. According to the Syria Central Bureau of Statistics (CBS), Al-Humayra had a population of 1,740 in the 2004 census.

References

External links 

Populated places in An-Nabek District